The 26th Utah Senate District is located in Daggett, Duchesne, Summit, Uintah and Wasatch Counties and includes Utah House Districts 25, 53, 54 and 55. The current State Senator representing the 26th district is Ronald Winterton. Winterton was elected to the Utah Senate in 2018 and is up for re-election in 2022.

Previous Utah State Senators (District 26)

Election results

2006 General Election

See also
 Kevin T. VanTassell
 Utah Democratic Party
 Utah Republican Party
 Utah Senate

External links
 Utah Senate District Profiles
 Official Biography of Kevin T. VanTassell

26
Daggett County, Utah
Duchesne County, Utah
Summit County, Utah
Uintah County, Utah
Wasatch County, Utah